Jewish land purchase in Palestine was the acquisition of land in Ottoman and Mandatory Palestine by Jews from the 1880s until the establishment of the State of Israel in 1948. By far the largest such arrangement was known as the Sursock Purchase. As of April 1st, 1945, Jews had acquired 5.67% of the land in Palestine.

Background

Towards the end of the 19th-century, the creation of the Zionist movement resulted in many European Jews immigrating to Palestine. Most land purchases between the late 1880s and the 1930s were located in the coastal plain area, including "Acre to the North and Rehovoth to the South, the Esdraelon (Jezreel) and Jordan Valleys and to the lesser extent in Galilee". The migration affected Palestine in many ways, including economically, socially, and politically.

The Talmud mentions the religious duty of settling the Land of Israel. It also allows for the lifting of certain religious restrictions of Sabbath observance to further its acquisition and settlement.

Land purchases

In the first half of the 19th century, no foreigners were allowed to purchase land in Palestine. This was official Ottoman policy until 1856 and in practice until 1867. When it came to the national aspirations of the Zionist movement, the Ottoman Empire opposed the idea of Jewish self-rule in Palestine, fearing it might lose control of Palestine after recently having lost other territories to various European powers. It also took issue with the Jews, as many came from Russia, which sought the empire's demise. In 1881 the Ottoman governmental administration (the Sublime Porte) decreed that foreign Jews could immigrate to and settle anywhere within the Ottoman Empire, except in Palestine and from 1882 until their defeat in 1918, the Ottomans continuously restricted Jewish immigration and land purchases in Palestine. In 1892, the Ottoman government decided to prohibit the sale of land in Palestine to Jews, even if they were Ottoman citizens. Nevertheless, during the late 19th century and the beginning of the 20th century, many successful land purchases were made through organizations such as the Palestine Jewish Colonization Association (PJCA), Palestine Land Development Company and the Jewish National Fund.

The Ottoman Land Code of 1858 "brought about the appropriation by the influential and rich families of Beirut, Damascus, and to a lesser extent Jerusalem and Jaffa and other sub-district capitals, of vast tracts of land in Syria and Palestine and their registration in the name of these families in the land registers". Many of the fellahin did not understand the importance of the registers and therefore the wealthy families took advantage of this. Jewish buyers who were looking for large tracts of land found it favorable to purchase from the wealthy owners. As well many small farmers became in debt to rich families which led to the transfer of land to the new owners and then eventually to the Jewish buyers.

In 1918, after the British conquest of Palestine, the military administration closed the Land Register and prohibited all sale of land. The Register was reopened in 1920, but to prevent speculation and ensure a livelihood for the fellahin, an edict was issued forbidding the sale of more than 300 dunams of land or the sale of land valued at more than 3000 Palestine pounds without the approval of the High Commissioner.

From the 1880s to the 1930s, most Jewish land purchases were made in the coastal plain, the Jezreel Valley, the Jordan Valley and to a lesser extent the Galilee. This was due to a preference for land that was cheap and without tenants. There were two main reasons why these areas were sparsely populated. The first reason being when the Ottoman power in the rural areas began to diminish in the seventeenth century, many people moved to more centralized areas to secure protection against the Bedouin tribes. The second reason for the sparsely populated areas of the coastal plains was the soil type. The soil, covered in a layer of sand, made it impossible to grow the staple crop of Palestine, corn. As a result, this area remained uncultivated and underpopulated. "The sparse Arab population in the areas where the Jews usually bought their land enabled the Jews to carry out their purchase without engendering a massive displacement and eviction of Arab tenants".

In the 1930s, most of the land was bought from landowners. Of the land that the Jews bought, 52.6% were bought from non-Palestinian landowners, 24.6% from Palestinian landowners, 13.4% from government, churches, and foreign companies, and only 9.4% from fellaheen (farmers).

On 31 December 1944, out of  dunums of land owned in Palestine by large Jewish Corporations and private owners, about 44% was in possession of Jewish National Fund.
The table below shows the land ownership of Palestine by large Jewish Corporations (in square kilometres) on 31 December 1945.

By the end of the mandate, more than half the Jewish-owned land was held by the two largest Jewish funds, the Jewish National Fund and the Palestine Jewish Colonization Association.

By the end of the British Mandate period in 1948, Jewish farmers had cultivated 425,450 dunams of land, while Palestinian farmers had 5,484,700 dunams of land under cultivation.

Peel Commission
The British government appointed the Peel Commission to investigate the reasons for the civil unrest in Palestine. Lord Peel's findings on land purchase were as follows:

Economic impact
The fellahin who sold land in an attempt to turn "vegetable tracts into citrus groves became dependent on world markets and on the availability of maritime transportation. A decrease in the world market demand for citrus or a lack of means of transportation severely jeopardized the economic situation of these people".

Influence on population
Director of Development Lewis French established a register of landless Arabs in 1931. Out of 3,271 applicants, only 664 were admitted and the remainder rejected. Porath suggests that the number of displaced Arabs may have been considerably larger, since French's definition of "landless Arab" excluded those who had sold their own land, those who owned land elsewhere, those who had since obtained tenancy of other land even if they were unable to cultivate it due to poverty or debt, and displaced persons who were not cultivators but had occupations such as ploughman or laborer.

See also
Jewish National Fund
Palestine Jewish Colonization Association
Peel Commission
Palestinian Land Laws
Concessions in Mandatory Palestine

References

Bibliography

External links
Land ownership in Palestine (1957)

History of Zionism
Jews and Judaism in Ottoman Palestine
Jews and Judaism in Mandatory Palestine